John William Brannon III (born March 10, 1998) is an American football cornerback for the Houston Roughnecks of the XFL. After playing college football for Western Carolina, he signed with the Los Angeles Chargers as an undrafted free agent in 2020.

College career
Brannon played college football at Western Carolina from 2016 to 2019.

Professional career

Los Angeles Chargers
Brannon signed with the Los Angeles Chargers as an undrafted free agent following the 2020 NFL Draft on April 26, 2020. He was waived during final roster cuts on September 5, 2020, and signed to the team's practice squad the next day. He was elevated to the active roster on January 2, 2021, for the team's week 17 game against the Kansas City Chiefs, and reverted to the practice squad after the game. He signed a reserve/future contract with the Chargers after the season on January 5, 2021. He was waived on August 31, 2021.

Carolina Panthers
On September 7, 2021, Brannon was signed to the Carolina Panthers practice squad. He was released on September 17, 2021.

Cincinnati Bengals
On December 17, 2021, Brannon was signed to the Cincinnati Bengals practice squad.

On February 15, 2022, Brannon signed a reserve/future contract. He was waived on July 27.

Houston Roughnecks 
On November 17, 2022, Brannon was drafted by the Houston Roughnecks of the XFL.

References

External links
 Los Angeles Chargers bio
 Western Carolina bio

1998 births
Living people
American football cornerbacks
Players of American football from Charlotte, North Carolina
Western Carolina Catamounts football players
Los Angeles Chargers players
Carolina Panthers players
Cincinnati Bengals players
Houston Roughnecks players